Methylbutanoic acid may refer to:

 2-Methylbutanoic acid
 3-Methylbutanoic acid

See also
 Methyl butanoate